Phragmataecia fusca is a species of moth of the family Cossidae. It is found in Taiwan, Thailand and Hong Kong.

References

Moths described in 1911
Phragmataecia